The Vice of Humanity (German: Laster der Menschheit) is a 1927 German silent drama film directed by Rudolf Meinert and starring Asta Nielsen, Werner Krauss and Alfred Abel. It premiered at the Marmorhaus in Berlin.

Plot
Opera singer Tamara is heavily addicted to cocaine. Her manager Mangol, who also acts as their coke supplier, goes in and out of her house and uses it as his drug transshipment point. Due to her addiction, Tamara has now lost both her husband and her daughter, who is growing up with her ex-husband. In order to spare his daughters' greater suffering, Mangol tells them both that their mother had died. When her daughter sits in the audience for one evening, she becomes a great admirer of Tamara's singing skills.

For Mangol, the young girl is nothing more than another potential customer whom he wants to make addicted to cocaine, but Tamara is on guard, and won't let it happen. Tamara decides to snatch her daughter from the dirty hands of the dealer and put her back in the safe hands of her ex-husband. Tamara sees no hope and commits an act of desperation. She snatches her daughter while Mangol is strangled by one of his junkie customers with bare hands.

Cast
Asta Nielsen as Tamara
Werner Krauss as cocainist
Alfred Abel as Mangol
Charles Willy Kayser   
Elizza La Porta
Trude Hesterberg
Maria Forescu
Carla Meissner
Sybille Lerchenfeld as Countess 
Ekkehard Arendt
Eberhard Leithoff

References

External links

Films of the Weimar Republic
German silent feature films
Films directed by Rudolf Meinert
1927 drama films
German drama films
German black-and-white films
Silent drama films
1920s German films